Svetomir Belić (Serbian Cyrillic: Светомир Белић; born 2 November 1946 as Svetomir Beljić) is a Serbian former boxer. Since retiring at the age of 33 in 1980, he has been a boxing coach.

He has been called a "legend of Serbian boxing."

Career
In 1971, as a member of the boxing section of the Partizan Sports Society, he won the silver medal at the European Amateur Boxing Championships.

He represented Yugoslavia at the 1972 Summer Olympics, where he was defeated by Anthony Richardson of the Netherlands in a second round bout in the light-middleweight division.

1972 Olympic record
Below is the record of Svetomir Belić at the 1972 Munich Olympics:

 Round of 64: defeated Dumar Fall (Senegal)  by decision, 4-1
 Round of 32: lost to Anthony Richardson (Netherlands) by decision, 2-3

References

External links
 Official site

1946 births
Living people
Sportspeople from Smederevo
Serbian male boxers
Yugoslav male boxers
Welterweight boxers
Olympic boxers of Yugoslavia
Boxers at the 1972 Summer Olympics
Mediterranean Games bronze medalists for Yugoslavia
Mediterranean Games medalists in boxing
Competitors at the 1975 Mediterranean Games